An addendum is an addition required to be made to a document by its author subsequent to its printing or publication.

Addendum may also refer to:

 Addendum (research platform), an Austrian journalistic research platform
 Addendum (John Maus album), 2018
 Addendum, 2001 album by Assemblage 23